Stewart Aerodrome  is a registered aerodrome located adjacent to Stewart, British Columbia, Canada. It shares its airspace with the nearby Stewart Water Aerodrome and Hyder Seaplane Base. While its neighbouring seaplane bases' water runways in the Portland Canal exist on the Canada–United States border, the aerodrome's runway exists entirely within Canada.

See also
Stewart Water Aerodrome

References

External links

Registered aerodromes in British Columbia
Regional District of Kitimat–Stikine
Binational airports